Ancient Egyptian deities were an integral part of ancient Egyptian religion and were worshipped for millennia. Many of them ruled over natural and social phenomena, as well as abstract concepts. These gods and goddesses appear in virtually every aspect of ancient Egyptian civilization, and more than 1,500 of them are known by name. Many Egyptian texts mention deities' names without indicating their character or role, while other texts refer to specific deities without even stating their name, so a complete list of them is difficult to assemble.

Major deities

Male
Aker – A god of earth and horizon
Amun  – A creator god, patron deity of the city of Thebes, and the preeminent deity in Egypt during the New Kingdom
Anhur – A god of war and hunting
Anubis – God of the dead. Carries the dead to the judgement place of the Underworld
Aten – Sun disk deity who became the focus of the monolatrous or monotheistic Atenist belief system in the reign of Akhenaten
Atum – A creator god and solar deity, first god of the Ennead
Bennu – A solar and creator deity, depicted as a heron
Geb – An earth god and member of the Ennead
Hapi – Personification of the Nile flood
Horus – A major god, usually shown as a falcon or as a human child, linked with the sky, the sun, kingship, protection, and healing. Often said to be the son of Osiris and Isis.
Khepri – A solar creator god, often treated as the morning form of Ra and represented by a scarab beetle
Khnum (Khnemu) – A ram god, the patron deity of Elephantine, who was said to control the Nile flood and give life to gods and humans
Khonsu – A moon god, son of Amun and Mut
Maahes (Mahes, Mihos) – A lion god, son of Bastet
Montu – A god of war and the sun, worshipped at Thebes
Nefertum – God of the lotus blossom from which the sun god rose at the beginning of time. Son of Ptah and Sekhmet.
Nemty – Falcon god, worshipped in Middle Egypt, who appears in myth as a ferryman for greater gods
Neper – A god of grain
Osiris – god of death and resurrection who rules the underworld and enlivens vegetation, the sun god, and deceased souls
Ptah – A creator deity and god of craftsmen, the patron god of Memphis
Ra – The sun god
Set – An ambivalent god, characterized by violence, chaos, and strength, connected with the desert. Mythological murderer of Osiris and enemy of Horus, but also a supporter of the king.
Shu – Embodiment of wind or air, a member of the Ennead
Sobek – Crocodile god, worshipped in the Faiyum and at Kom Ombo
Sopdu – A god of the sky and of Egypt's eastern border regions
Thoth – A moon god, and a god of writing and scribes, and patron deity of Hermopolis
Wadj-wer – Personification of the Mediterranean sea or lakes of the Nile Delta

Female
Amunet – Female counterpart of Amun and a member of the Ogdoad
Anuket – A feathered headdress wearing goddess of Egypt's southern frontier regions, particularly the lower cataracts of the Nile
Bastet – Goddess represented as a cat or lioness, patroness of the city of Bubastis, linked with protection from evil
Bat – Cow goddess from early in Egyptian history, eventually absorbed by Hathor
Hathor (Egyptian: Het-Hert) – One of the most important goddesses, linked with the sky, the sun, sexuality and motherhood, music and dance, foreign lands and goods, and the afterlife. One of many forms of the Eye of Ra.
Hatmehit - Fish goddess
Heqet – Frog goddess said to protect women in childbirth
Hesat – A maternal cow goddess
Imentet (Amentet) – An afterlife goddess closely linked with Isis and Hathor
Isis – Wife of Osiris and mother of Horus, linked with funerary rites, motherhood, protection, and magic. She became a major deity in Greek and Roman religion.
Maat – Goddess who personified truth, justice, and order
Menhit – A lioness goddess
Mut – Consort of Amun, worshipped at Thebes
Neith – A creator and hunter goddess, patron of the city of Sais in Lower Egypt
Nekhbet (Nekhebit) – A vulture goddess, the tutelary deity of Upper Egypt
Nephthys (Egyptian: Nebet-Het) – A member of the Ennead, the consort of Set, who mourned Osiris alongside Isis
Nepit – A goddess of grain, female counterpart of Neper
Nut – A sky goddess, a member of the Ennead
Pakhet – A lioness goddess mainly worshipped in the area around Beni Hasan
Renenutet – An agricultural goddess
Satet – A goddess of Egypt's southern frontier regions
Sekhmet – A lioness goddess, both destructive and violent and capable of warding off disease, protector of the pharaohs who led them in war, the consort of Ptah and one of many forms of the Eye of Ra.
Tefnut – Lioness goddess of moisture and a member of the Ennead
Wadjet (Uatchit) – A cobra goddess, the tutelary deity of Lower Egypt
Wosret (Egyptian: Usret) – A goddess of Thebes

Both male and female forms
Anubis/Anput – The god/goddess of embalming and protector of the dead
Hapi – Personification of the Nile flood
Heh – Personification of infinity and a member of the Ogdoad
Kek – The god of Chaos and Darkness, as well as being the concept of primordial darkness. Kek's female form is known as Kauket.
Nu (Nun) – Personification of the formless, watery disorder from which the world emerged at creation and a member of the Ogdoad
Ra (Re) – The foremost Egyptian sun god, involved in creation and the afterlife. Mythological ruler of the gods, father of every Egyptian king, and the patron god of Heliopolis.
Tatenen – Personification of the first mound of earth to emerge from chaos in ancient Egyptian creation myths

Minor deities

Male

 Aani - A protector ape headed god
 Aati - One of the 42 judges of the souls of the dead
 Abu -Abu was an early Egyptian god of Light that was likely worshiped in the city of Elephantine.
Am-heh - A dangerous underworld god
 Amenhotep I (Amenhetep I) - The second king of the eighteenth dynasty, deified
Amenhotep son of Hapu - A scribe and architect in the court of Amenhotep III, later deified for his wisdom
 Amu-Aa - A god who accompanies Osiris during the second hour of the night
 An-a-f - One of the 42 judges of the souls of the dead
 An-hetep-f - One of the 42 judges of the souls of the dead
 An-mut-f
 An-tcher-f
 Andjety (Anedjti, Anezti) - A god of the ninth nome of Upper Egypt
 Ani - A god of festivals
 Anti - A hawk god of Upper Egypt
Apedemak - A warlike lion god from Nubia who appears in some Egyptian-built temples in Lower Nubia
Apep  (Apepi) - A serpent deity who personified malevolent chaos and was said to fight Ra in the underworld every night
 Āpesh - A turtle god
Apis - A live bull worshipped as a god at Memphis and seen as a manifestation of Ptah
Arensnuphis - A Nubian deity who appears in Egyptian temples in Lower Nubia in the Greco-Roman era
 Asclepius - A Greek god worshipped in Egypt at Saqqara
Ash - A god of the Libyan Desert and oases west of Egypt
Astennu - A baboon god associated with Thoth.
 Ba - A god of fertility
 Ba-Ra
Baal - Sky and storm god from Syria and Canaan, worshipped in Egypt during the New Kingdom
Babi - A baboon god characterized by sexuality and aggression
Banebdjedet - A ram god, patron of the city of Mendes
Ba-Pef - A little-known underworld deity; ram-headed god of the eighth hour
Bes - Apotropaic god, represented as a dwarf, particularly important in protecting children and women in childbirth
Buchis - A live bull god worshipped in the region around Thebes and a manifestation of Montu
Dedun (Dedwen) - A Nubian god, said to provide the Egyptians with incense and other resources that came from Nubia
 Denwen - A serpent and dragon god
 Djebuty - Tutelary god of Djeba
 Djefa - God of abundance
 Dionysus-Osiris - A life-death-rebirth god.
 Dua - God of toiletry and sanitation
 Fa - A god of destiny
 Fetket - A butler of Ra
 Gengen Wer - A celestial goose god who guarded the celestial egg containing the life force
Ha - A god of the Libyan Desert and oases west of Egypt
 Ḥapy (Hapi) - A son of Horus
 Hapy-Wet - God of the Nile in heaven
 Hardedef (Djedefhor) - Son of King Khufu who was deified after death because he wrote a book considered to be the work of a god
 Harmachis (Hor-em-akhet) - Sphinx god
 Harsomtus - A child god of Edfu
 Haurun - A protector and healing god, originally a Canaanite god
Heka (Hike) - Personification of magic
 Heneb - A god of grain
 Henkhisesui - God of the east wind
 Heru-Khu - A god in the fifth division of Tuat
 Hery-sha-duat - Underworld god in charge of the fields of Tuat
 Heryshaf - Ram god worshipped at Herakleopolis Magna
 Hu - Personification of the authority of the spoken word
 Iah (Aah, Yah) - A moon god
 Ihy (Ihu) - A child deity born to Horus and Hathor, representing the music and joy produced by the sistrum
 Imhotep - Architect and vizier to Djoser, eventually deified as a healer god
 Jupiter-Amun - A Roman influenced god worshipped at the Siwa Oasis in Egypt
 Kagemni - A vizier to Sneferu who wrote the Instructions of Kagemni, later deified
 Khentekhtai (Khente-Khtai) - Crocodile god worshipped at Athribis
 Khenti-Amenti(u)- A necropolis deity
 Khenti-qerer
Kherty - A netherworld god, usually depicted as a ram
 Khesfu - A god who carries a spear in the tenth division of Tuat
 Kneph - A ram creator god
Mandulis - A Lower Nubian solar deity who appeared in some Egyptian temples
Mehen - A serpent god who protects the barque of Ra as it travels through the underworld
 Mestȧ (Imset) - A son of Horus
Min - A god of virility, as well as the cities of Akhmim and Qift and the Eastern Desert beyond them
Mnevis - A live bull god worshipped at Heliopolis as a manifestation of Ra
 Nefer Hor - A son of Thoth
 Neferhotep - Son of Hathor
 Nefertum (Nefertem) - God of perfume who was an aspect of Atum, but later became a separate deity
Nehebu-Kau - A protective serpent god
 Panebtawy - A child god, son of Horus the Elder
 Petbe - God of revenge
 Peteese - Brother of Pihor who drowned in the Nile, later deified
 Pihor - Brother of Peteese who drowned in the Nile, later deified
 Ptah-hotep - Writer of a Wisdom Text, later deified
 Qebeḥsenuf (Qebehsenuef) - A son of Horus
 Qebui - God of the north winds
 Ra-ateni
 Rā-Ḥerakhty - A form of Ra in which he is joined with Horus.
Reshep - A Syrian war god adopted into Egyptian religion in the New Kingdom, depicted with beard and the crown of Upper Egypt
 Sah - Personification of the constellation Orion
 Sebeg - Personification of the planet Mercury
 Sebiumeker - Guardian god of procreation and fertility, he was a major god in Meroe, Kush
 Sed - A jackal deity who protected kingship
Seker - God of the Memphite Necropolis and of the afterlife in general
 Sekhemus - God of the fourth hour of Tuat
 Sepa - A centipede god who protected people from snake bites
 Sepes - A god who lived in a tree
 Sepṭu - A bearded plume wearing god
Serapis - A Greco-Egyptian god from the Ptolemaic Period who fused traits of Osiris and Apis with those of several Greek gods. Husband of Isis who, like her, was adopted into Greek and Roman religion outside Egypt.
 Seta-Ta - A mummified god in the fourth division of Tuat
 Setcheh - A serpent demon
 Setem - A god of healing
Shed - A god believed to save people from danger and misfortune
Shehbui - God of the south wind
Shezmu - A god of wine and oil presses who also slaughters condemned souls
Sia - Personification of perception
 Sopd - God of the eastern delta
 Sopdet (Sothis) - Personification of the star Sirius, mother of Sopdu
 Ṭuamutef (Duamutef) - A son of Horus
Tutu - An apotropaic god from the Greco-Roman era
Uneg/Weneg - A plant god and son of Ra who maintains cosmic order
 Wenenu - A protector god
Wepwawet - A jackal god, the patron deity of Asyut, connected with warfare and the afterlife
Yam - A Syrian god of the sea who appears in some Egyptian texts

Female

 Ahti - A malevolent hippopotamus goddess
 Amathaunta - An ocean goddess
Ammit - Goddess who devoured condemned souls
 Amn - A goddess who welcomed souls of the dead in the Underworld
Anat (Anta) – A war and fertility goddess, originally from Syria, who entered Egyptian religion in the Middle Kingdom. A daughter of Re, thus, in Egypt, a sister of Astarte.
 Anhefta - A protective spirit who guards one end of the ninth division of Tuat
 Anit - Wife of Andjety
 Anuke - A war goddess
 Ảpet - A solar disc wearing goddess worshipped at Thebes
Astarte - A warrior goddess from Syria and Canaan who entered Egyptian religion in the New Kingdom
Ba'alat Gebal - A Canaanite goddess, patroness of the city of Byblos, adopted into Egyptian religion
 Besna - Goddess of home security
 Esna - A divine perch
Hatmehit - Fish goddess worshipped at Mendes
Hedetet - A minor scorpion goddess
 Heptet - A knife holding goddess of death
 Heret-Kau - A protector goddess who protected the souls of the dead in the afterlife
 Hert-ketit-s - A lioness headed goddess in the eleventh division of Tuat
 Hert-Nemmat-Set - A goddess in the eleventh division of Tuat who punishes the damned
 Hert-sefu-s - A goddess in the eleventh division of Tuat
 Heru-pa-kaut - A mother goddess with a fish on her head
 Heset - Goddess of food and drink
 Hetepes-Sekhus - A personification of the eye of Ra, also a cobra goddess
 Iabet - Goddess of fertility and rebirth
Iat - A goddess of milk and nursing
 Ipy - A mother goddess depicted as a hippopotamus
 Ishtar - The East Semitic version of Astarte, occasionally mentioned in Egyptian texts
 Iusaaset (Ausaas) - A female counterpart to Atum; a solar disc wearing goddess worshipped at Heliopolis
 Iw - A creation goddess
 Kebehut - Daughter of Anubis, goddess of freshness, she helps him in mummifying dead bodies
 Ken - Goddess of love
 Khefthernebes - A funerary deity
Mafdet - A predatory goddess said to destroy dangerous creatures
Matit - A funerary cat goddess who had a cult center at Thinis
Mehet-Weret - A celestial cow goddess
Mehit - A warrior lioness goddess originally from Nubia worshipped at Abydos, consort of Anhur
 Menhit (Menhyt) - A solar lioness goddess who personified the brow of Ra
Meretseger - A cobra goddess who oversaw the Theban Necropolis
 Meret - The goddess of music who established cosmic order
Meskhenet (Mesenet) - A goddess who presided over childbirth
 Nakith - A goddess of the underworld
 Naunet – female counterpart to Nun
Nebethetepet - A female counterpart to Atum
 Nebt-Ankhiu - A goddess of the underworld
 Nebt-Khu - A goddess of the underworld
 Nebt-Mat - A goddess of the underworld
 Nebt-Setau - A goddess of the underworld
 Nebt-Shat - A goddess of the underworld
 Nebt-Shefshefet - A goddess of the underworld
 Nefertari - The mother of Amenhotep I, deified
Nehmetawy - A minor goddess, the consort of Nehebu-Kau or Thoth
 Pelican - Goddess of the dead
 Perit - A goddess of the underworld
 Pesi - A goddess of the underworld
 Qererti
 Qerhet - Goddess of the eight nomes of Lower Egypt
Qetesh (Qudshu) - A goddess of sexuality and sacred ecstasy from Syria and Canaan, adopted into Egyptian religion in the New Kingdom
Raet-Tawy - A female counterpart to Ra
 Rekhit - A goddess of the underworld
 Renenet - Goddess of fortune
Renpet - Goddess who personified the year
 Sait - A goddess of the underworld
 Sefkhet-Abwy - Goddess of writing and temple libraries
 Sehith - A goddess of the underworld
 Sekhat-Hor - A cow goddess
 Sekhet-Metu - A goddess of the underworld
 Seret - A lioness goddess possibly originally from Libya
Serket - A scorpion goddess, invoked for healing and protection
 Sesenet-Khu - A goddess of the underworld
Seshat - Goddess of writing and record-keeping, depicted as a scribe
 Shemat-Khu - A goddess of the underworld
 Shentayet - A protective goddess possibly of widows
 Shenty - A cow goddess
Shesmetet - A lioness goddess
Sopdet - Deification of the star Sirius
 Swenet - Goddess related to Aswan
Ta-Bitjet - A minor scorpion goddess
 Tafner - A vulture headdress wearing goddess
 Ta-Sent-Nefert - A wife of Horus the elder
Taweret (Thoeris)  - Hippopotamus goddess, protector of women in childbirth
 Tayt (Tayet) - Goddess of weaving
 Temet - A female counterpart to Atum 
 Temtith - A goddess of the underworld
Tenenet - Goddess of brewing and protection
 Themath - A goddess of the underworld
 Thermuthis - Goddess of fate, fertility, and harvest
 Thmei - Goddess of truth
 Tjenmyt - Goddess of beer
Unut - A goddess represented as a snake or a hare, worshipped in the region of Hermopolis
 Usit - A goddess of the underworld
 Wepset - A protector serpent goddess
Werethekau - A goddess who protected the king

Male or female
 Hedjhotep - God of fabrics and clothing
Shai - Personification of fate

Objects

 Semi - A deified object found in the tenth division of Tuat

Lesser-known deities

Male
 Ȧakhu - God of the fifth Ảat 
 Ảakhu - A ram headed god
 Ảakhu-ḥetch-t - A god of the dead
 Ảakhu-ra - A singing god of dawn
 Ảakhu-sa-ta-f - A warrior god
 Ảakhui - A god with two lotus scepters
 Ȧmi-beq - A god of the dead
 Ảmi-haf - A god who has a harpoon
 Ami-Ḥe-t-Serqet-Ka-hetep-t - A god
 Ảmi-kar - A singing ape god
 Ảmi-keḥau - A god 
 Ảmi-naut-f - A serpent god
 Ảmi-nehţ-f - A god
 Ảmi-neter - A singing god
 Ảmi-Nu - A sky god 
 Ȧmi-Pe - A lion god 
 Ảmi-reţ - A god
 Ảmi-seḥseḩ - A god
 Ảmi-sekhet-f - A god of his domain 
 Ảmi-sepa-f - A god 
 Ảmi-suḥt-f - A god of the ninth Ảat 
 Ảmi-ta - A serpent god 
 Ảmi-ut - God of the ninth day of the month
 Ảnmut-făbesh - A star god 
 Antywy - A god of the tenth nome of Upper Egypt God of the sixth hour of night.
 Aqen - A deity of the underworld
 Ảri - The creative god
 Ảri-em-ăua - God of the sixth hour of night
 Ảri-en-ȧb-f - A blue eyed god
 Ảri-ḥetch-f - A light god
 Ảri-ren-f-tehesef - God of the tenth day of the month
 Ảri-tchet-f - A god of the ninth day of the month
 Ảrit-Ảmen - A god
 Athpi - A god of dawn
 Ati - A god
 Ba - A ram god associated with virility 
 Ba-ảakhu-hā-f - A ram headed god
 Ba-em-uār-ur - A god
 Ba-ta - An ape god
 Ba-tau - A god worshipped at Cynopolis
 Ba-utcha-hāu-f - A ram-headed god
 Ḥeb - A god
 Ḥun-sāḥu - A god
 Ḥutchai - The god of the west wind
 Khenti-en-Sa-t - A star god
 Khenti-heh-f - A knife-eyed god who guarded the tomb of Osiris 
 Khenti-ḥenthau - A god 
 Khenti-Ḥet Ȧnes - A god 
 Khenti-kha-t-ảnes - A knife-eyed god who guarded Osiris
 Khenti-Khas - A god who protected noses of the dead
 Maa-ảb-khenti-ảḥ-t-f - A god
 Maa-ảtht-f - A god of the fourteenth Ảat
 Maa-en-Rā - An ape doorkeeper god
 Maa-f-ur - A god
 Maa-ḥa-f - A ferry god
 Maa-mer-f - God of the twenty-sixth day of the month
 Men-t - A god 
 Meni - A god
 Menu - A god of the fifth month
 Menu-nesu-Ḩeru - A warrior bull god
 Menu-qeṭ - God of the first Ảat
 Meţ-en-Ảsảr - A serpent god
 Meţ-ḥer - A god of the dead
 Meṭes - A god
 Meţes - A doorkeeper god
 Meţes-ảb - An ibis headed god
 Meṭes-neshen - A god
 Meţi - A hawk headed god
 Meţni - A hippopotamus god of evil
 Meţu-ta-f - A god
 Neb - A goose god, also a watcher of Osiris 
 Neb ảa - A singing god of dawn
 Neb ảmakh - A god who towed the boat of Ảf
 Neb ankh - A singing god of dawn
 Neb āq-t - A jackal god
 Neb Kheper-Khenti-Ṭuat - A Maāt god
 Neb Khert-ta - A star god
 Neb pāt - A god
 Neb seb-t - A god
 Neb Uast - A god of the boat of Pakhit
 Neb-Un - A god
 Neb user - A ram-headed god
 Neb utchat-ti - A serpent god with human legs
 Nebti - A god
 Nekenher - A frightening god
 Neter - A serpent god
 Neterti - A god in Ṭuat
 Neter bah - A god
 Neter neferu - A god
 Neter-hāu - Nile god
 Neter-ka-qetqet - A god who guarded Osiris
 Neter-kha - God of one thousand years
 Netrit-ta-meh - An axe god
 Netrit-Then - An axe god
 Serq - A serpent god 
 Unnti - The god of existence 
 Untả - A light god
 Up - An ape god
 Up-hai - God of the dead
 Up-shāt-taui - A god
 Up-uatu - A singing god
 Upi-sekhemti - A jackal-headed singing god
 Upt-heka - Enchantment god
 Upȧst - A light god
 Upu - God of the serpent Shemti
 Ur - A god
 Ur-ȧres (Urȧrset) - A god of a boat
 Ur-at - A god of Kher-Āḥa
 Ur-heka - A god of Denderah
 Ur-henhenu - A water god
 Ur-henu - A water god
 Ur-khert - A jackal god in the second Ảat
 Ur-maati-f - A god
 Ur-metuu-ḩer-ȧat-f - A god
 Ur-peḥti - A doorkeeper god
 Ur-peḩui-f - A god
 Urrtȧ - A god

Female

 Ảmi-khent-āat - A goddess of Edfû
 Ảmi-pet-seshem-neterit  - One of the 12 Thoueris goddesses
 Ảmi-urt - A cow goddess
 Ảmi-utchat-sảakhu-Ảtemt - One of the 12 Thoueris goddesses
 Ảmit-Qeţem - A goddess who assisted resurrecting Osiris
 Ảmit-she-t-urt - A goddess
 Āpertra - A singing goddess
 Ảrit-ȧakhu - A star goddess
 Ảriti - A goddess
 Ba-khati - A goddess
 Baiut-s-ảmiu-heh - A goddess
 Ḥebit - An air goddess
 Hetemit - Goddess of destruction
 Ḥunit - Goddess of the twenty first day of the month
 Ḥunit Pe - A tutelary goddess of Buto
 Ḥunit urit - A tutelary goddess of Heliopolis
 Ḥuntheth - A lioness goddess
 Ḥurit urit - A goddess
 Maa-ā - A singing god
 Maa-neter-s - A singing goddess
 Neb Ȧa-t (Nebt Ȧa-t) - A goddess
 Neb Ȧa-t-Then (Nebt Ȧa-t-Then) - A goddess
 Neb āāu (Nebt āāu) - A goddess
 Neb-ābui (Nebt-ābui) - A goddess
 Neb ȧkeb (Nebt ȧkeb) - A goddess
 Neb Ȧnit (Nebt Ȧnit) - A goddess
 Neb ảri-t-qerr-t (Nebt ȧri-t-qerr-t) - A goddess
 Neb ảrit-tcheṭflu - Goddess who created reptiles
 Neb ảs-ḥatt - A goddess
 Neb ȧs-ur (Nebt ȧs-ur) - A goddess
 Neb Ȧter (Nebt Ȧter-Meḥ) - A goddess
 Neb ȧter-Shemā (Nebt ȧter-Shemā) - A goddess
 Neb ảur (Nebt ảur) - A goddess of the river
 Neb Aut (Neb-t Aut) - A goddess
 Neb Bȧa-t (Nebt Bȧa-t) - A goddess
 Neb ḥekau (Nebt ḥekau) - The goddess of spells
 Neb ḥetep (Nebt ḥetep) - A crocodile goddess
 Neb Khasa (Nebt Khasa) - A goddess
 Neb Khebit (Nebt Khebit) - The goddess of Chemmis
 Neb peḥti (Nebt peḥti) - A goddess
 Neb Per-res (Nebt Per-res) - A goddess
 Neb petti (Nebt petti) - A goddess
 Neb Sa (Nebt Sa) - A goddess
 Neb Sam (Nebt Sam) - A goddess
 Neb sau-ta (Nebt sau-ta) - A goddess
 Neb sebu (Nebt sebu) - A goddess
 Neb Septi (Nebt Septi) - A goddess
 Neb-t ȧakhu - A serpent goddess of dawn
 Neb-t ȧnemit - A goddess of offerings
 Neb-t ānkh - One of twelve goddesses who opened the gates of Ṭuat to Ảf
 Neb-t ānkhiu - A goddess with two serpents
 Neb-t Ảţu - A goddess
 Neb-t au-t-ȧb - A cow goddess
 Neb-t Kheper - A serpent goddess
 Neb-t usha - Goddess of the eighth division of the Ṭuat
 Neb Un (Nebt Un) - A goddess
 Nebt Ānnu - A goddess
 Neterit-nekhenit-Rā - A singing goddess in Ṭuat
 Un-baiusit (Unt-baiusit) - A goddess
 Unnit - A goddess
 Unnuit - A goddess
 Upit - A serpent goddess
 Ur-ā - A goddess
 Urit - A goddess
 Urit-ȧmi-t-Ṭuat - A goddess of escorting Ra
 Urit-em-sekhemu-s - Goddess of the fourth hour
 Urit-en-kru - A lioness headed hippopatomus goddess
 Urit-ḥekau - Goddess of Upper Egypt
 Urti-ḥethati - Goddess of Ánu

Male or female
 Medjed - A minor god from the Book of the Dead. "
 Neb au-t-ȧb - A god or goddess in the Ṭuat (needs additional citation for verification)
 Netrit fent - An axe god or goddess (needs additional citation for verification)

Groups of deities
 The Aai – 3 guardian deities in the ninth division of Tuat; they are Ab-ta, Anhefta, and Ermen-ta
 The Cavern deities – Many underworld deities charged with punishing the damned souls by beheading and devouring them.
The Ennead – An extended family of nine deities produced by Atum during the creation of the world. The Ennead usually consisted of Atum, his children Shu and Tefnut, their children Geb and Nut, and their children Osiris, Isis, Set, and Nephthys.
The Theban Triad consisted of Amun, his consort Mut and their son Khonsu.
The four sons of Horus – Four gods who protected the mummified body, particularly the internal organs in canopic jars.
The Gate deities – Many dangerous guardian deities at the gates of the underworld (flanked by divine Doorkeepers and Heralds), to be ingratiated by spells and knowing their names.
The Hemsut (or Hemuset) – Protective goddesses of Fate, destiny, and of the creation sprung from the primordial abyss; daughters of Ptah, linked to the concept of ka
 The Her-Hequi – 4 deities in the fifth division of Tuat
 The Hours of the day deities – 12 divine embodiments of each hour of the day: partly major deities (1st: Maat and Nenit, 2nd: Hu and Ra em-nu, 3rd: unknown, 4th: Ashespi-kha, 5th: Nesbit and Agrit, 6th: Ahait, 7th: Horus and Nekait or Nekai-t, 8th: Khensu and Kheprit, 9th: Neten-her-netch-her and Ast em nebt ankh, 10th: Urit-hekau or Hekau-ur, 11th: Amanh, and partly lesser-known ones (12th: "The One Who Gives Protection In The Twilight").
The Hours of the night deities – 12 goddesses of each hour of the night, wearing a five-pointed star on their heads. Neb-t tehen and Neb-t heru, god and goddess of the 1st hour of night, Apis or Hep (in reference) and Sarit-neb-s, god and goddess of the 2nd hour of night, M'k-neb-set, goddess of the 3rd hour of night, Aa-t-shefit or Urit-shefit, goddess of the 4th hour of the night, Heru-heri-uatch-f and Neb[t] ankh, god and goddess of the 5th hour of the night, Ari-em-aua (god) or Uba-em-tu-f and Mesperit, neb-t shekta or Neb-t tcheser, god and goddess of the 6th hour of the night, Heru-em-sau-ab and Herit-t-chatcha-ah, god and goddess of the 7th hour of the night, Ba-pefi and Ankh-em-neser-t or Merit-neser-t, god and goddess of the 8th hour of night, An-mut-f and Neb-t sent-t, god and goddess of the 9th hour of the night, Amset or Neb neteru and M'k-neb-set, god and goddess of the 10th hour of night, Uba-em-tu-f and Khesef-khemit or M'kheskhemuit, god and goddess of the 11th hour, Khepera and Maa-neferut-Ra, god and goddess of the 12th hour of the night.
 The 42 judges of Maat – 42 deities including Osiris who judged the souls of the dead in the afterlife 
 The Khnemiu – 4 deities wearing red crowns in the eleventh division of Tuat
The Ogdoad – A set of eight gods who personified the chaos that existed before creation. The Ogdoad commonly consisted of Amun – Amunet, Nu – Naunet, Heh – Hauhet, and Kek – Kauket.
 The Renniu – 4 bearded gods in the eleventh division of Tuat
 The Setheniu-Tep – 4 deities wearing white crowns in the eleventh division of Tuat
The Souls of Pe and Nekhen – A set of gods personifying the predynastic rulers of Upper and Lower Egypt.
 The 12 Thoueris goddesses

Citations

Works cited

Lorton, Claude Traunecker. Transl. from the French by David (2001). The gods of Egypt (1st English-language edn, enhanced and expanded). Ithaca, N.Y [u.a.]: Cornell University Press. .
Budge, Sir Ernest A. Wallis (2010). An Egyptian hieroglyphic dictionary (in two volumes, with an index of English words, king list and geographical list with indexes, list of hieroglyphic characters, Coptic and Semitic alphabets). New York: Cosimo Classics. .
"Aswan History Facts and Timeline: Aswan, Egypt". http://www.world-guides.com/africa/egypt/aswan/aswan_history.html.
Petry, Alan W. Shorter; with a new bibliography by Bonnie L. (1994). The Egyptian gods : a handbook (rev. edn). San Bernardino (Calif.): The Borgo Press. .
"Gods of Egypt". http://www.touregypt.net/godsofegypt/.
 Willockx, Sjef. "Amentet, Andjeti and Anubis: Three Ancient Egyptian Gods (2007)".
Mark, Joshua J. "Egyptian Gods - The Complete List". https://www.worldhistory.org/article/885/egyptian-gods---the-complete-list/.
Nelson, Thomas (2017). The Woman's Study Bible: Receiving God's Truth for Balance, Hope, and Transformation. Biblica, Inc.
"GVC09-24: Mystical creatures and gods -Egyptian". 
Durdin-Robertson, Lawrence (1979). Communion With The Goddess: Idols, Images, and Symbols of the Goddesses; Egypt Part III. Cesara Publications.
translations, translated by Raymond O. Faulkner; with additional; Wasserman, a commentary by Ogden Goelet JR.; with color illustrations from the facsimile volume produced in 1890 under the supervision of E.A. Wallis Budge; introduced by Carol A. R. Andrews; edited by Eva Von Dassow; in an edition conceived by James (1994). The Egyptian Book of the dead : the Book of going forth by day : being the Papyrus of Ani (royal scribe of the divine offerings), written and illustrated circa 1250 B.C.E., by scribes and artists unknown, including the balance of chapters of the books of the dead known as the theban recension, compiled from ancient texts, dating back to the roots of Egyptian civilization (1st edn). San Francisco: Chronicle Books. .

Further reading
 Vol. I: ; Vol. II: ;  Vol. III: ;  Vol. IV: ;  Vol. V: ; Vol. VI: ;  Vol. VII: ;  Vol. VIII: .

 
Deities
Egyptian